Nabarun Bose (born 30 December 1988) is an Indian keyboard player, composer and music producer from Kolkata, West Bengal. He made his debut as a music director in 2018 with the feature film Rainbow Jelly. Previously, he had directed music for the television film Loadshedding in 2015, and had scored the background music for many films and webseries including the short film Ahalya, Sharate Aaj, Kaali season 1 & season 2, Feluda, Bhalobashar Shohor, Mafia and many others. He has been acclaimed for his work as a music director in the films Tangra Blues and Mukhosh(2021). As a music producer, his career spans over nine years. He is known for arranging and programming music for Anupam Roy in films like Piku, Chotushkone, Highway, Pink and many others. He is also an intrinsic part of The Anupam Roy Band, where he plays keyboards. He is also the keyboard player for the experimental bleak-rock band Enolaton and he also works as a vocalist and songwriter for the rap-metal band The Prophesor. As a keyboard player and music producer he has worked with many other bands and artists including Fossils, Ganesh Talkies, Neel and the Ligtbulbs, Zoo and many others. He was awarded Song Producer of the Year at the Mirchi Music Awards Bangla 2018 and the best music director award at WBFJA 2021.

Early life
Bose's mother is an Indian classical vocalist. Nabarun completed his schooling at Patha Bhavan. When he was 17, he became interested in becoming a musician. During college, he was playing for various bands and did studio sessions for music directors. He earned an undergraduate and a postgraduate degree in English literature from Presidency College, Kolkata. After graduating, he taught for a year at Kishore Bharati Bhagini Nivedita College as a part-time professor before quitting the job to pursue music full time.

Music

Bose's first professional band was a Hindi pop-rock band called ‘The Colors’ who released their first album ‘Naya Din’ from ‘Purple Music’ in 2010. In 2011, he met Anupam Roy and became one of the founding members of The Anupam Roy Band. In 2013, Bose began producing and arranging music.

In 2015, he made his playback debut with Office Song from the movie Katmundu. In the same year he debuted as music director for the Bengali movie Loadshedding. He composed background scores for the movie Jomer Raja Dilo Bor and Dwitiyo Ripu and has been recognized for his background score of Ahalya, a short film directed by Sujoy Ghosh.

Nabarun also fronts a Bengali alternative-metal band called The Prophesor where he works as a vocalist and songwriter. As of September 2020, The Prophesor has released their first EP - "Year One" on various digital platforms. He is also the keyboard player for the alternative-rock project Enolaton.

Discography

with The Anupam Roy Band

with other bands

Filmography

As a music producer

As a music director

As a vocalist

Jingles
Jibon Gorar Gaan (2012) for George Telegraph S.C. – Music Arranger
Ei Samay Theme Song (2012) for Ei Samay Sangbadpatra – Music Arranger
 Nomoshkar Kolkata (2017) for Central (Future Group) - Organ
 Hiland River (2019) for Hiland Group - Background Score
 PS Group Pujo (2019) for PS Group - Background Score
 Solaris Shalimar Eden Real Estate (2021) - Music Director
 Ruchi Masala Promo TVC (2021) - Music Director
 Shyam Steel (Feat.Manpreet Singh and Lovlina Borgohain) (2021) - Music Director

Singles
Second Sex (2013) with The Anupam Roy Band – Keyboard, Melodica & Backing Vocals
Cha E Rock "Promo Song" (2016) with The Prophesor for Cha E Rock – Vocal, Music, Lyrics & Melodica
Voter Baddi (2016) with Anupam Roy for ABP Ananda – Music Arranger & Programmer
Pulse Rate (2017) for Aprokashito – Vocal, Music & Lyrics
Poyla Rock Official Anthem Song (2018) - Vocal, Rap, Music Arranger & Programmer
Jodi Phirey Dekhtam (2019) for Aprokashito - Vocal, Music & Lyrics
Boitoronir Teere (2021) - Vocal, Music & Lyrics

Awards and nominations
 Mirchi Music Awards Bangla 2015 - Upcoming Male Vocalist of the Year: Office Song (Katmundu) - Nominated
 Mirchi Music Awards Bangla 2016 - Best Music Producer: Ghorir Kaantar Mawto (Shaheb Bibi Golaam) - Nominated
 WBFJA Awards 2019 - Best Background Music: Rainbow Jelly - Nominated
 Mirchi Music Awards Bangla 2018 - Best Song Producer (Programming and Arranging): Tui Ki Kore Dili (Ghare & Baire) - Winner
 Virgin Spring Cinefest 2021 - Best Music Score (Silver Award): Three Hours in Grayscale (Short Film) - Winner
 WBFJA Cinemar Samabartan 2021- Best Music Director for Tangra Blues-Winner.
 WBFJA Cinemar Samabartan 2021- Best Background Score- F.I. R- Nominated.
 Filmfare Awards East 2022- Nominated- Best Music Album- Tangra Blues
 Filmfare Awards East 2022- Nominated- Best Background Score- F.I. R
 Anandalok Awards 2022- Nominated- Best Music Director- Tangra Blues

References

1988 births
Living people
Singers from Kolkata
Bengali singers
Indian male singer-songwriters
Indian singer-songwriters